Salvatore Cardillo (20 February 1874 – 5 February 1947) was an Italian-American composer. Born in Naples, he studied piano and composition in Italy before emigrating in 1903 to the United States as a university graduate. His career encompassed songwriting and movie music. He died in New York.

Cardillo's richly scored and still popular 1911 romance Core 'ngrato (Ungrateful Heart) — also known by its lyric Catarì, Catarì, pecchè me dici sti parole amare — was written in America to a text in Neapolitan dialect by Alessandro Sisca (Riccardo Cordiferro); it is in fact the only famous Neapolitan song by an Italian-American immigrant. The song's first exponent was the operatic tenor Enrico Caruso, but it is not clear whether he commissioned it. Franco Corelli, Luciano Pavarotti, Plácido Domingo, José Carreras and, more recently, Roberto Alagna and Jonas Kaufmann are among the tenors to have included Core 'ngrato in their repertories.

The composer also wrote the songs Barcarola, to a text by Edoardo San Giovanni, and Oi luna (O Silvery Moon), to a text by Riccardo Cordiferro. These were published in 1921 as "Two Neapolitan Songs" by G. Schirmer Inc. in New York.

Bibliography
Sciorra, Joseph. “Diasporic Musings on Veracity and Uncertainties of ‘Core ‘ngrato’,” "Neapolitan Postcards: The Canzone Napoletana as Transnational Subject," Ed. Goffredo Plastino and Joseph Sciorra. (Lanham, MD: The Scarecrow Press, 2016), 115–150. 
Frasca, Simona. “Italian Birds of Passage: The Diaspora of Neapolitan Musicians in New York,” (Palgrave Macmillan, 2014).
Laird, Ross, et al., eds (2001). Brunswick Records: A Discography of Recordings, 1916-1931. Westport: Greenwood Press.
Lavery, David (2002). Investigating the Sopranos. New York: Columbia University Press..

1874 births
1947 deaths
Italian songwriters
Male songwriters
Italian emigrants to the United States